DA-Group is a Finnish technology company which produces RF-electronics and software for the defense, space and industrial sectors. DA-Group is headquartered in Forssa, with offices in Helsinki, Oulu, Tampere and Turku. The group consists of the parent company, DA-Design Oy, and several fully owned subsidiaries. The group was founded in 1995, and as of 2018 employs 100 staff. Products manufactured by the group include naval protection system SURMA.

History

1995-2013 (DA-Design) 
DA-Design Oy, DA-Group's parent company, was established in 1995, and expanded partially through acquisitions; in the beginning of 2008, the company purchased Elektrobit Microwave's space business unit (originally Ylinen Oy). In the fall of 2009, DA-Design acquired Cross Country Systems Oy's defence sector and industry automation operations.

2014-present (DA-Group) 
In 2014, "DA-Group" was registered as the auxiliary business name to cover both DA-Design Oy and its subsidiaries. In 2015, DA-Group purchased Hämeen Paino Oy from Sanoma Media.

In the spring of 2017, DA-Group purchased a part of Microsoft's testing laboratories and equipment in Tampere, which had previously belonged to previously Nokia, offering accredited testing services for electronic and mobile equipment, with roughly 20 employees.  The company acquired an injection mold and precision mechanics business the following year, and also purchased a Helsinki-based company, Surma Ltd, in late 2018. The companies had previously collaborated in naval and underwater technology solutions.

In 2019, DA–Group and Elbit Systems EW & SIGINT–Elisra started collaboration on the production and marketing of Immune Satellite Navigation System (iSNS), used for protecting against GPS interference and jamming threats. DA-Group also purchased Creowave Filters, which designs and manufacturers high performance radio frequency filters for special applications in defence and the mobile network industry.

In 2020, DA-Group debuted their new Turso naval mine system at a Euronaval event. The system includes an MM30 influence sea mine and naval minelaying system, and algorithm development tools as well as training units for countermeasure divers.

Products 

The DA-group defense produces electronic warfare self-protection test system Darad and underwater and marine defense system SURMA. Its civil products include electromagnetic compatibility services and equipment Its electronics used in space missions, such as Vaisala weather radars (low noise microwave synthesizer devices) and the ESA and EUMETSAT program's MetOp-SG satellites (89 GHz receivers).

References 

Electronics companies of Finland
Space program of Finland
Technology companies established in 1995
Finnish companies established in 1995